The Finnish Formula Three Championship was a single seater motor racing series based in Finland. The championship used small Formula Three cars, designed to give drivers experience before moving to higher levels of motor racing. The Finnish Formula Three Championship ran from 1958–1960, 1984–1986 and 2000–2009, and for its final season in 2010 it became known as the Nordic F3 Masters.

An independent championship known as the Scandinavian & Nordic Formula Three Championship ran between 1984–1985 and 1992–2001.

Scoring system

Champions

2010 season
The calendar consists of five events across Finland and Estonia. The Botniaring round was later cancelled.

See also
Formula Three

References

External links
Finnish Formula 3 Championship at forix.com
Nordic F3 Masters official website

1958 establishments in Finland
2010 disestablishments in Finland
Formula Three series
Auto racing series in Finland
Defunct auto racing series
Formula